Parrish is a 1961 American drama film made by Warner Bros. It was written, produced and directed by Delmer Daves, based on Mildred Savage's 1958 novel of the same name. The music score was by Max Steiner, the Technicolor cinematography by Harry Stradling Sr., the art direction by Leo K. Kuter and the costume design by Howard Shoup. The film stars Troy Donahue, Claudette Colbert (in her final theatrical film role), Karl Malden, Dean Jagger, Connie Stevens, Diane McBain, Sharon Hugueny, Sylvia Miles, Madeleine Sherwood and Hayden Rorke.

Plot
The film shows the story of conflict between a young, independent-minded man and his stepfather, a ruthless tobacco tycoon. Young Parrish McLean and his mother live on Sala Post's tobacco plantation in the state of Connecticut. His mother marries Post's ambitious rival Judd Raike, who then sets about ruining Post. They were growing Connecticut shade tobacco extensively visible in some scenes.

Cast
 Troy Donahue as Parrish McLean
 Claudette Colbert as Ellen McLean
 Karl Malden as Judd Raike
 Dean Jagger as Sala Post
 Connie Stevens as Lucy
 Diane McBain as Alison Post
 Sharon Hugueny as Paige Raike
 Dub Taylor as Teet Howie
 Hampton Fancher as Edgar Raike
 David Knapp as Wiley Raike
 Saundra Edwards as Evaline Raike
 Sylvia Miles as Eileen
 Bibi Osterwald as Rosie
 Madeleine Sherwood as Addie
 Hayden Rorke as Tom Weldon

Other notable appearances include Frank Campanella as Foreman, Terry Carter as Cartwright, Don Dillaway as Max Maine, Gertrude Flynn as Miss Daly, Vincent Gardenia in a bit part, House Jameson as Oermeyer, and Carroll O'Connor as Firechief.

Original novel
Warners bought the film rights, even before publication. for a figure reported to be between $160,000 and $200,000. When the novel was published in 1958 the New York Times called it an "impressive debut".

Production
The original director was Joshua Logan with John Patrick to write the script. Clark Gable was mentioned as a possible male lead. A nationwide talent search was launched to find the younger male lead although Anthony Perkins was also a frontrunner. Natalie Wood was announced as young female lead.

Delmer Daves then became involved as director, which saw Troy Donahue come on board as the lead.

Parts of the movie were shot in East Windsor and Poquonock (Windsor), Connecticut. Mildred Savage, on whose novel the film was based, was a frequent visitor to the set. She was quoted during filming as saying:
My central theme — and fortunately Mr. Daves agrees about this — is that young people today are neither "beat" or "lost". I wanted to show an affirmative hero who may be confused because of his youth and sex troubles, but who is still masculine, unaffected and optimistic — able to get ahead on his own two feet. The idea of setting this story in the tobacco industry came last. It seemed sensible to put a vigorous, healthy young man to work in the soil.
Delmer Daves differentiated the film from his earlier A Summer Place:
There I tried to dramatize the terrible end of communication between parents and children. Here, in this day of mass identification, I show the need for a young man to establish his individual liberty against the world's increasing push towards conformity.
It was Claudette Colbert's first film in nine years. "I didn't really intend to make another picture", she admitted at the time. "I took this one because I felt it had a point of view. The mother wants to break the silver cord and lead a normal sex life of her own."

"Working with these kids is a little tough sometimes", said Karl Malden of the film's youthful cast. "Still, they're eager and they're learning. And we can always do retakes if something goes wrong."

Soundtrack
Max Steiner composed the film score. On this film he made use of his belief that "every character should have a theme." The Warner Bros. Records soundtrack (WS-1413) recording used five of the film's main themes in both a short version and a concerto versions. In addition to the "Tobacco Theme", (for tobacco heir Parrish McLean), "Paige's Theme", "Allison's Theme", "Lucy's Theme", and "Ellen's Theme;" the soundtrack included Steiner's song "Someday I'll Meet You Again" (from Passage to Marseille). Max Steiner conducted the Warner Bros. Orchestra. Side 2 of the soundtrack album featured George Greeley as guest pianist, playing three of the film themes, together with two other Steiner film themes, Tara's Theme (from Gone With The Wind) and the Theme from A Summer Place. George Greeley was also featured on several singles issued by Warner Brothers.

Reception
The film was a success at the box office but received little critical acclaim.

A 1965 New York Times article called it "pure camp".

In 1967, Donahue described the film as the most satisfying of his movies to date. "I had the best script and the best opportunity as an actor", he said. "Not too many of those came my way."

See also
 List of American films of 1961

References

External links
 
 
 
 

1961 drama films
1961 films
American drama films
1960s English-language films
Films based on American novels
Films directed by Delmer Daves
Films scored by Max Steiner
Films set in Connecticut
Films shot in Connecticut
Warner Bros. films
1960s American films